The 2014 BNP Paribas Katowice Open is a women's tennis tournament played on indoor hard courts. It is the 2nd edition of the BNP Paribas Katowice Open, in the International category of the 2014 WTA Tour. It will take place at Spodek arena in Katowice, Poland, from April 7 through April 13, 2014.

Points and prize money

Point distribution

Prize money

Singles main-draw entrants

Seeds 

 1 Rankings as of March 31, 2014.

Other entrants 
The following players received wildcards into the main draw:
  Alizé Cornet
  Magdalena Fręch
  Kristýna Plíšková

The following players received entry as a special exempt into the singles main draw:
  Jovana Jakšić

The following players received entry from the qualifying draw:
  Vera Dushevina 
  Claire Feuerstein 
  Kristína Kučová
  Ksenia Pervak

Withdrawals
Before the tournament
  Kirsten Flipkens (ankle injury) --> replaced by Andrea Hlaváčková
  Polona Hercog --> replaced by Alison Van Uytvanck
  María Teresa Torró Flor --> replaced by Vesna Dolonc

WTA doubles main-draw entrants

Seeds 

 1 Rankings as of March 31, 2014.

Other entrants 
The following pairs received wildcards into the main draw:
  Magdalena Fręch /  Zuzanna Maciejewska
  Klaudia Jans-Ignacik /  Raluca Olaru
The following pairs received entry as alternates:
  Veronika Kapshay /  Teodora Mirčić

Withdrawals
Before the tournament
  Tamira Paszek (left rib injury)

Champions

Singles 

  Alizé Cornet def.  Camila Giorgi, 7–6(7-3), 5–7, 7–5

Doubles 

  Yuliya Beygelzimer /  Olga Savchuk def.   Klára Koukalová /  Monica Niculescu, 6–4, 5–7, [10–7]

References

External links 
 

BNP Paribas Katowice Open
Katowice Open
Katowice Open
BNP Paribas Katowice Open